"Rearview Town" is a song written by Kelley Lovelace, Bobby Pinson, and Neil Thrasher and recorded by American country music singer Jason Aldean. It was released in February 2019 as the fourth and final single from Aldean's 2018 album of the same name.

Music video
The music video premiered on April 15, 2019, and was directed by Shaun Silva. It features Aldean singing the song behind a moving wall containing past pictures and video of his life and career, ending with a shot of him walking down a dirt road.

Commercial performance
"Rearview Town" became Jason Aldean's 31st top 10 hit on the Billboard Hot Country Songs chart in July 2019. It reached No. 1 on Billboard Country Airplay chart dated August 31, 2019, which made this Aldean's 21st No. 1 on the chart, also making Aldean sixth in ranking as artist with the most No. 1 songs on the chart. The song has sold 112,000 copies in the United States as of September 2019.

Charts

Weekly charts

Year-end charts

Certifications

References

2019 singles
2018 songs
Jason Aldean songs
BBR Music Group singles
Song recordings produced by Michael Knox (record producer)
Songs written by Kelley Lovelace
Songs written by Bobby Pinson
Songs written by Neil Thrasher